The Vaasa railway station is located in the city of Vaasa, Finland. It is located along the Seinäjoki–Vaasa railway; it is one of the termini for passenger trains that use the line, and its neighboring station in the east is Tervajoki.

Services 

Vaasa is one of the termini for all passenger trains that use the Seinäjoki–Vaasa line; the routes include Helsinki–Vaasa and Seinäjoki–Vaasa. All trains arriving to and departing from the station use track 1.

External links

References 

Vaasa
Railway stations in Ostrobothnia